The Régie des alcools, des courses et des jeux (RACJ) is the board established by the government of Quebec to regulate the alcohol, lottery, publicity contests, gambling, racing, and combat sports industries. There are seventeen commissioners on the board, including a president, usually two vice-presidents, all appointed by the government for a term not exceeding five years.

External links 
 

Canadian provincial alcohol departments and agencies
Quebec government departments and agencies